Sea Point is a limited edition 12" vinyl released by Anticipate Recordings that includes three tracks from Mark Templeton's Inland release along with three additional tracks. The 12" vinyl was released on August 17, 2009.

Track listing
A1."Beginnings"–3:03
A2."Sleep In Front Of"–5:13
A3."At Your Feet"–3:48

B1."Telepathy"–2:49
B2."Increasing By Numbers"–4:18
B3."Traditional Instruments"–3:30

External links
Mark Templeton's website
Anticipate Recordings' website
OMG Vinyl Album Review
Textura Album Review

2009 albums
Mark Templeton (electronic musician) albums